The 1967 Philadelphia Phillies season consisted of the Phillies' 82–80 finish, good for fifth place in the National League,  games behind the NL and World Series Champion St. Louis Cardinals.  The Phillies would not finish above .500 again until 1975.

Offseason 
 November 28, 1966: Bo Belinsky was drafted from the Phillies by the Houston Astros in the 1966 rule 5 draft.
 November 30, 1966: Darold Knowles and cash were traded by the Phillies to the Washington Senators for Don Lock.
 December 10, 1966: Joe Verbanic and cash were traded by the Phillies to the New York Yankees for Pedro Ramos.
 December 21, 1966: Rubén Gómez was acquired by the Phillies from the Rojos del Águila de Veracruz.

Regular season

Season standings

Record vs. opponents

Notable transactions 
 June 5, 1967: Pedro Ramos was released by the Phillies.
 June 6, 1967: Bob Uecker was traded by the Phillies to the Atlanta Braves for Gene Oliver.
 June 22, 1967: Dick Groat was purchased from the Phillies by the San Francisco Giants.

Game log

|- style="background:#fbb"
| 1 || April 11 || @ Cubs || 2–4 || Ferguson Jenkins (1–0) || Jim Bunning (0–1) || None || 16,462 || 0–1
|- style="background:#bfb"
| 2 || April 12 || @ Cubs || 5–4 (11) || Rick Wise (1–0) || Rich Nye (0–1) || None || 2,690 || 1–1
|- style="background:#bbb"
| – || April 13 || @ Cubs || colspan=6 | Postponed (rain); Makeup: August 10
|- style="background:#bfb"
| 3 || April 14 || Mets || 5–1 || Chris Short (1–0) || Jack Fisher (0–1) || None || 26,649 || 2–1
|- style="background:#bfb"
| 4 || April 15 || Mets || 6–2 || Jim Bunning (1–1) || Bob Shaw (0–1) || None || 5,195 || 3–1
|- style="background:#bfb"
| 5 || April 16 || Mets || 2–0 || Larry Jackson (1–0) || Bill Denehy (0–1) || None || 9,213 || 4–1
|- style="background:#bbb"
| – || April 17 || Cubs || colspan=6 | Postponed (rain); Makeup: June 6 as a traditional double-header
|- style="background:#fbb"
| 6 || April 18 || Cubs || 4–8 || Bill Hands (1–0) || Chris Short (1–1) || None || 3,172 || 4–2
|- style="background:#bbb"
| – || April 19 || Pirates || colspan=6 | Postponed (cold weather); Makeup: June 15 as a traditional double-header
|- style="background:#fbb"
| 7 || April 21 || @ Mets || 3–6 || Jack Fisher (1–1) || Jim Bunning (1–2) || Don Shaw (3) || 5,093 || 4–3
|- style="background:#bfb"
| 8 || April 22 || @ Mets || 4–3 || Larry Jackson (2–0) || Bob Shaw (0–2) || None || 15,032 || 5–3
|- style="background:#bfb"
| 9 || April 23 (1) || @ Mets || 10–6 || Grant Jackson (1–0) || Don Shaw (0–1) || None || see 2nd game || 6–3
|- style="background:#bfb"
| 10 || April 23 (2) || @ Mets || 3–1 || Dick Ellsworth (1–0) || Bill Denehy (0–2) || None || 38,081 || 7–3
|- style="background:#fbb"
| 11 || April 25 || @ Pirates || 3–7 || Billy O'Dell (1–0) || Jim Bunning (1–3) || None || 5,585 || 7–4
|- style="background:#bbb"
| – || April 26 || @ Pirates || colspan=6 | Postponed (rain); Makeup: August 31
|- style="background:#fbb"
| 12 || April 27 || @ Pirates || 4–5 || Pete Mikkelsen (1–0) || Dick Hall (0–1) || Bill Short (1) || 4,979 || 7–5
|- style="background:#fbb"
| 13 || April 28 || @ Braves || 8–9 || Clay Carroll (2–2) || Dick Hall (0–2) || None || 12,921 || 7–6
|- style="background:#fbb"
| 14 || April 29 || @ Braves || 2–3 || Pat Jarvis (2–0) || Chris Short (1–2) || Phil Niekro (3) || 12,200 || 7–7
|- style="background:#bfb"
| 15 || April 30 (1) || @ Braves || 6–4 || Grant Jackson (2–0) || Clay Carroll (2–3) || Dick Hall (1) || see 2nd game || 8–7
|- style="background:#fbb"
| 16 || April 30 (2) || @ Braves || 3–6 || Bob Bruce (1–0) || Rick Wise (1–1) || Phil Niekro (4) || 27,644 || 8–8
|-

|- style="background:#fbb"
| 17 || May 2 || Astros || 3–10 || Mike Cuellar (2–1) || Larry Jackson (2–1) || None || 4,568 || 8–9
|- style="background:#bfb"
| 18 || May 3 || Astros || 1–0 || Chris Short (2–2) || Larry Dierker (2–2) || None || 4,428 || 9–9
|- style="background:#fbb"
| 19 || May 4 || Astros || 1–4 || Turk Farrell (1–0) || Dick Ellsworth (1–1) || Carroll Sembera (1) || 3,591 || 9–10
|- style="background:#bfb"
| 20 || May 5 || Dodgers || 3–1 || Jim Bunning (2–3) || Jim Brewer (0–1) || Chris Short (1) || 12,805 || 10–10
|- style="background:#bbb"
| – || May 6 || Dodgers || colspan=6 | Postponed (rain); Makeup: July 18 as a traditional double-header
|- style="background:#bbb"
| – || May 7 || Dodgers || colspan=6 | Postponed (rain); Makeup: September 15 as a traditional double-header
|- style="background:#bbb"
| – || May 8 || Braves || colspan=6 | Postponed (rain); Makeup: May 10 as a traditional double-header
|- style="background:#bfb"
| 21 || May 9 || Braves || 3–2 || Chris Short (3–2) || Clay Carroll (2–4) || Dick Hall (2) || 3,770 || 11–10
|- style="background:#bfb"
| 22 || May 10 (1) || Braves || 4–3 || Turk Farrell (2–0) || Phil Niekro (0–1) || None || see 2nd game || 12–10
|- style="background:#fbb"
| 23 || May 10 (2) || Braves || 2–7 || Wade Blasingame (1–0) || Larry Jackson (2–2) || Phil Niekro (6) || 9,252 || 12–11
|- style="background:#fbb"
| 24 || May 12 || @ Reds || 2–4 || Sammy Ellis (3–2) || Dick Ellsworth (1–2) || None || 10,460 || 12–12
|- style="background:#bfb"
| 25 || May 13 || @ Reds || 3–2 || Turk Farrell (3–0) || Billy McCool (3–2) || None || 16,076 || 13–12
|- style="background:#fbb"
| 26 || May 14 (1) || @ Reds || 1–2 || Jim Maloney (2–2) || Larry Jackson (2–3) || Ted Abernathy (11) || see 2nd game || 13–13
|- style="background:#fbb"
| 27 || May 14 (2) || @ Reds || 0–1 || Gary Nolan (3–1) || Jim Bunning (2–4) || None || 12,381 || 13–14
|- style="background:#fbb"
| 28 || May 16 || @ Cardinals || 3–4 || Joe Hoerner (1–1) || Grant Jackson (2–1) || None || 10,514 || 13–15
|- style="background:#fbb"
| 29 || May 17 || @ Cardinals || 2–3 || Dick Hughes (1–1) || Turk Farrell (3–1) || None || 15,923 || 13–16
|- style="background:#bfb"
| 30 || May 18 || Reds || 7–1 || Jim Bunning (3–4) || Billy McCool (3–3) || None || 8,045 || 14–16
|- style="background:#fbb"
| 31 || May 19 || Reds || 1–6 || Jim Maloney (3–2) || Larry Jackson (2–4) || None || 12,204 || 14–17
|- style="background:#fbb"
| 32 || May 20 || Reds || 2–5 || Gerry Arrigo (4–0) || Grant Jackson (2–2) || None || 6,299 || 14–18
|- style="background:#bfb"
| 33 || May 21 || Reds || 2–1 (18) || Dick Hall (1–2) || Darrell Osteen (0–1) || None || 8,641 || 15–18
|- style="background:#fbb"
| 34 || May 22 || Giants || 1–3 || Gaylord Perry (2–4) || Jim Bunning (3–5) || None || 9,341 || 15–19
|- style="background:#fbb"
| 35 || May 23 || Giants || 4–5 (11) || Frank Linzy (3–1) || Turk Farrell (3–2) || Bill Henry (2) || 9,920 || 15–20
|- style="background:#bbb"
| – || May 24 || Giants || colspan=6 | Postponed (rain); Makeup: June 30 as a traditional double-header
|- style="background:#bfb"
| 36 || May 26 || Cardinals || 7–4 || Dick Hall (2–2) || Ron Willis (1–1) || Turk Farrell (1) || 15,365 || 16–20
|- style="background:#fbb"
| 37 || May 27 || Cardinals || 4–11 || Larry Jaster (3–1) || Grant Jackson (2–3) || Nelson Briles (1) || 6,351 || 16–21
|- style="background:#fbb"
| 38 || May 28 || Cardinals || 3–8 || Steve Carlton (3–1) || Larry Jackson (2–5) || None || 11,250 || 16–22
|- style="background:#fbb"
| 39 || May 29 || @ Giants || 9–12 || Joe Gibbon (1–0) || Dick Ellsworth (1–3) || Lindy McDaniel (1) || 6,875 || 16–23
|- style="background:#bfb"
| 40 || May 30 || @ Giants || 5–4 || Jim Bunning (4–5) || Juan Marichal (8–4) || None || 26,981 || 17–23
|- style="background:#bfb"
| 41 || May 31 || @ Dodgers || 6–0 (11) || Dick Hall (3–2) || Don Drysdale (5–4) || None || 16,044 || 18–23
|-

|- style="background:#bfb"
| 42 || June 1 || @ Dodgers || 6–1 || Larry Jackson (3–5) || Claude Osteen (6–5) || None || 16,597 || 19–23
|- style="background:#bfb"
| 43 || June 2 || @ Astros || 5–3 || Dick Ellsworth (2–3) || Chris Zachary (0–6) || Turk Farrell (2) || 12,794 || 20–23
|- style="background:#bfb"
| 44 || June 3 || @ Astros || 4–2 || Jim Bunning (5–5) || Larry Dierker (5–3) || None || 20,930 || 21–23
|- style="background:#bfb"
| 45 || June 4 || @ Astros || 6–1 || Turk Farrell (4–2) || Dan Schneider (0–1) || Dick Hall (3) || 25,836 || 22–23
|- style="background:#fbb"
| 46 || June 5 || Cubs || 3–13 || Bob Hendley (2–0) || Larry Jackson (3–6) || Cal Koonce (2) || 5,865 || 22–24
|- style="background:#bfb"
| 47 || June 6 (1) || Cubs || 8–6 || Dick Hall (4–2) || Chuck Hartenstein (0–1) || None || see 2nd game || 23–24
|- style="background:#bfb"
| 48 || June 6 (2) || Cubs || 9–8 || Turk Farrell (5–2) || Ray Culp (3–5) || None || 14,576 || 24–24
|- style="background:#fbb"
| 49 || June 7 || Cubs || 1–3 || Ferguson Jenkins (7–3) || Jim Bunning (5–6) || None || 8,137 || 24–25
|- style="background:#fbb"
| 50 || June 9 || @ Pirates || 1–16 || Billy O'Dell (5–2) || Rick Wise (1–2) || None || 17,064 || 24–26
|- style="background:#fbb"
| 51 || June 10 || @ Pirates || 3–4 || Al McBean (2–0) || Dick Hall (4–3) || None || 17,587 || 24–27
|- style="background:#bfb"
| 52 || June 11 || @ Pirates || 14–1 || Jim Bunning (6–6) || Juan Pizarro (3–6) || None || 15,915 || 25–27
|- style="background:#bfb"
| 53 || June 12 || Braves || 7–4 || Turk Farrell (6–2) || Dick Kelley (1–6) || None || 9,874 || 26–27
|- style="background:#fbb"
| 54 || June 13 || Braves || 0–1 || Phil Niekro (2–2) || Rick Wise (1–3) || None || 10,722 || 26–28
|- style="background:#fbb"
| 55 || June 14 || Braves || 7–16 || Ken Johnson (6–4) || Larry Jackson (3–7) || Bob Bruce (1) || 10,143 || 26–29
|- style="background:#bfb"
| 56 || June 15 (1) || Pirates || 4–1 || Dick Hall (5–3) || Bob Veale (7–2) || None || see 2nd game || 27–29
|- style="background:#fbb"
| 57 || June 15 (2) || Pirates || 2–5 || Steve Blass (2–1) || Dick Ellsworth (2–4) || None || 24,480 || 27–30
|- style="background:#bfb"
| 58 || June 16 || Pirates || 5–3 || Larry Jackson (4–7) || Billy O'Dell (5–4) || None || 20,796 || 28–30
|- style="background:#fbb"
| 59 || June 17 || Pirates || 5–6 || Dennis Ribant (3–3) || Jim Bunning (6–7) || Roy Face (10) || 9,595 || 28–31
|- style="background:#fbb"
| 60 || June 18 || Pirates || 3–5 || Tommie Sisk (5–4) || Rick Wise (1–4) || Juan Pizarro (1) || 14,726 || 28–32
|- style="background:#bfb"
| 61 || June 20 || Mets || 4–0 || Larry Jackson (5–7) || Bob Hendley (2–1) || None || 7,718 || 29–32
|- style="background:#fbb"
| 62 || June 21 || Mets || 0–2 || Jack Fisher (5–7) || Jim Bunning (6–8) || None || 8,229 || 29–33
|- style="background:#bbb"
| – || June 22 || Mets || colspan=6 | Postponed (rain); Makeup: August 15 as a traditional double-header
|- style="background:#fbb"
| 63 || June 23 || @ Cardinals || 2–3 || Dick Hughes (7–2) || Rick Wise (1–5) || None || 31,727 || 29–34
|- style="background:#fbb"
| 64 || June 24 || @ Cardinals || 1–2 || Bob Gibson (9–5) || Larry Jackson (5–8) || None || 19,486 || 29–35
|- style="background:#bfb"
| 65 || June 25 (1) || @ Cardinals || 6–4 || Jim Bunning (7–8) || Larry Jaster (4–3) || Dick Hall (4) || see 2nd game || 30–35
|- style="background:#bfb"
| 66 || June 25 (2) || @ Cardinals || 10–4 || John Boozer (1–0) || Al Jackson (5–3) || None || 47,020 || 31–35
|- style="background:#fbb"
| 67 || June 26 || @ Cubs || 2–4 || Rich Nye (6–3) || Turk Farrell (6–3) || Chuck Hartenstein (1) || 9,145 || 31–36
|- style="background:#bfb"
| 68 || June 27 || @ Cubs || 4–2 || Rick Wise (2–5) || Curt Simmons (3–6) || Dick Hall (5) || 12,769 || 32–36
|- style="background:#bfb"
| 69 || June 28 || @ Mets || 6–5 || John Boozer (2–0) || Tom Seaver (6–5) || Dick Hall (6) || 20,396 || 33–36
|- style="background:#bfb"
| 70 || June 29 || @ Mets || 1–0 || Jim Bunning (8–8) || Jack Fisher (5–9) || None || 13,653 || 34–36
|- style="background:#bfb"
| 71 || June 30 (1) || Giants || 10–3 || Chris Short (4–2) || Gaylord Perry (5–10) || None || see 2nd game || 35–36
|- style="background:#fbb"
| 72 || June 30 (2) || Giants || 3–12 || Juan Marichal (11–6) || Turk Farrell (6–4) || None || 22,618 || 35–37
|-

|- style="background:#fbb"
| 73 || July 1 || Giants || 2–3 || Mike McCormick (9–3) || Rick Wise (2–6) || Frank Linzy (10) || 20,181 || 35–38
|- style="background:#bfb"
| 74 || July 2 || Giants || 8–7 || Dick Hall (6–3) || Lindy McDaniel (1–4) || None || 11,667 || 36–38
|- style="background:#bfb"
| 75 || July 4 (1) || Astros || 9–0 || Chris Short (5–2) || Dave Giusti (4–8) || None || see 2nd game || 37–38
|- style="background:#bfb"
| 76 || July 4 (2) || Astros || 4–3 (11) || Larry Jackson (6–8) || Barry Latman (1–4) || None || 16,368 || 38–38
|- style="background:#bfb"
| 77 || July 5 || Astros || 3–2 || Rick Wise (3–6) || Mike Cuellar (9–4) || Dick Hall (7) || 7,547 || 39–38
|- style="background:#fbb"
| 78 || July 7 || Cardinals || 1–5 || Steve Carlton (7–5) || Larry Jackson (6–9) || None || 21,176 || 39–39
|- style="background:#fbb"
| 79 || July 8 || Cardinals || 4–6 (12) || Nelson Briles (4–2) || Dick Hall (6–4) || Al Jackson (1) || 21,488 || 39–40
|- style="background:#bfb"
| 80 || July 9 || Cardinals || 4–3 (10) || Rick Wise (4–6) || Ron Willis (1–3) || None || 19,619 || 40–40
|- style="background:#bbcaff;"
| – || July 11 ||colspan="7" |1967 Major League Baseball All-Star Game at Anaheim Stadium in Anaheim
|- style="background:#bbb"
| – || July 13 || @ Braves || colspan=6 | Postponed (rain); Makeup: September 4 as a day-night double-header
|- style="background:#fbb"
| 81 || July 14 || @ Braves || 2–4 || Tony Cloninger (3–4) || Rick Wise (4–7) || Cecil Upshaw (1) || 21,168 || 40–41
|- style="background:#fbb"
| 82 || July 15 || @ Braves || 2–5 || Pat Jarvis (9–3) || Chris Short (5–3) || None || 21,118 || 40–42
|- style="background:#bfb"
| 83 || July 16 || @ Reds || 8–0 || Jim Bunning (9–8) || Gerry Arrigo (5–4) || None || 15,512 || 41–42
|- style="background:#fbb"
| 84 || July 17 || @ Reds || 5–8 || Ted Abernathy (3–3) || Dick Hall (6–5) || None || 7,517 || 41–43
|- style="background:#bfb"
| 85 || July 18 (1) || Dodgers || 5–0 || Rick Wise (5–7) || Don Sutton (6–11) || None || see 2nd game || 42–43
|- style="background:#fbb"
| 86 || July 18 (2) || Dodgers || 1–2 || Phil Regan (3–4) || John Boozer (2–1) || Ron Perranoski (8) || 17,746 || 42–44
|- style="background:#fbb"
| 87 || July 19 || Dodgers || 1–3 (11) || Jim Brewer (3–2) || Chris Short (5–4) || Ron Perranoski (9) || 12,337 || 42–45
|- style="background:#bfb"
| 88 || July 20 || Dodgers || 10–4 || Larry Jackson (7–9) || Claude Osteen (11–10) || None || 11,311 || 43–45
|- style="background:#bfb"
| 89 || July 21 || Reds || 5–3 || Turk Farrell (7–4) || Sammy Ellis (6–7) || Dick Hall (8) || 15,899 || 44–45
|- style="background:#bfb"
| 90 || July 22 || Reds || 7–2 || Rick Wise (6–7) || Jim Maloney (8–6) || None || 16,733 || 45–45
|- style="background:#fbb"
| 91 || July 23 || Reds || 1–2 || Milt Pappas (9–7) || Chris Short (5–5) || Ted Abernathy (15) || 13,063 || 45–46
|- style="background:#fbb"
| 92 || July 24 || @ Astros || 1–2 (11) || Mike Cuellar (10–6) || Dick Hall (6–6) || None || 20,275 || 45–47
|- style="background:#bfb"
| 93 || July 25 || @ Astros || 12–7 || Jim Bunning (10–8) || Wade Blasingame (3–3) || John Boozer (1) || 15,294 || 46–47
|- style="background:#fbb"
| 94 || July 26 || @ Astros || 2–3 || Larry Sherry (1–1) || Rick Wise (6–8) || None || 10,741 || 46–48
|- style="background:#bfb"
| 95 || July 27 || @ Giants || 8–3 || John Boozer (3–1) || Mike McCormick (13–5) || None || 9,786 || 47–48
|- style="background:#fbb"
| 96 || July 28 || @ Giants || 2–7 || Juan Marichal (13–9) || Larry Jackson (7–10) || None || 16,155 || 47–49
|- style="background:#fbb"
| 97 || July 29 || @ Giants || 1–6 || Gaylord Perry (7–12) || Jim Bunning (10–9) || None || 16,839 || 47–50
|- style="background:#fbb"
| 98 || July 30 || @ Dodgers || 0–1 || Don Sutton (7–12) || Chris Short (5–6) || None || 20,806 || 47–51
|- style="background:#bfb"
| 99 || July 31 || @ Dodgers || 4–2 (11) || Dick Hall (7–6) || Ron Perranoski (3–5) || Turk Farrell (3) || 18,442 || 48–51
|-

|- style="background:#bfb"
| 100 || August 1 || @ Dodgers || 2–1 || Larry Jackson (8–10) || Claude Osteen (12–11) || None || 20,893 || 49–51
|- style="background:#bfb"
| 101 || August 2 || @ Dodgers || 3–2 (10) || Jim Bunning (11–9) || Phil Regan (4–5) || Turk Farrell (4) || 19,512 || 50–51
|- style="background:#bfb"
| 102 || August 4 || Astros || 7–1 || Dick Ellsworth (3–4) || Don Wilson (8–6) || None || 7,349 || 51–51
|- style="background:#bfb"
| 103 || August 5 || Astros || 10–3 || John Boozer (4–1) || Wade Blasingame (4–4) || Grant Jackson (1) || 4,695 || 52–51
|- style="background:#bfb"
| 104 || August 6 || Astros || 8–4 || Dick Hall (8–6) || Don Wilson (8–7) || None || 25,845 || 53–51
|- style="background:#bfb"
| 105 || August 7 || Giants || 8–0 || Jim Bunning (12–9) || Gaylord Perry (8–13) || None || 15,383 || 54–51
|- style="background:#bfb"
| 106 || August 8 || Giants || 5–4 (10) || Turk Farrell (8–4) || Frank Linzy (5–6) || None || 15,896 || 55–51
|- style="background:#bbb"
| – || August 9 || Giants || colspan=6 | Postponed (rain); Makeup: September 30 as a traditional double-header in San Francisco
|- style="background:#fbb"
| 107 || August 10 || @ Cubs || 2–3 || Chuck Hartenstein (6–2) || Dick Hall (8–7) || Bill Stoneman (1) || 9,557 || 55–52
|- style="background:#bfb"
| 108 || August 11 || @ Cubs || 2–1 || Jim Bunning (13–9) || Jim Ellis (0–1) || None || 8,766 || 56–52
|- style="background:#bfb"
| 109 || August 12 || @ Cubs || 9–0 || Dick Ellsworth (4–4) || Joe Niekro (6–6) || None || 16,719 || 57–52
|- style="background:#fbb"
| 110 || August 13 (1) || @ Cubs || 2–6 || Ken Holtzman (6–0) || John Boozer (4–2) || Bill Stoneman (2) || see 2nd game || 57–53
|- style="background:#fbb"
| 111 || August 13 (2) || @ Cubs || 0–1 || Ferguson Jenkins (16–9) || Rick Wise (6–9) || None || 32,750 || 57–54
|- style="background:#fbb"
| 112 || August 14 || Mets || 3–8 || Jack Fisher (8–13) || Larry Jackson (8–11) || None || 7,311 || 57–55
|- style="background:#bfb"
| 113 || August 15 (1) || Mets || 3–2 (12) || Turk Farrell (9–4) || Hal Reniff (3–5) || None || see 2nd game || 58–55
|- style="background:#bfb"
| 114 || August 15 (2) || Mets || 7–5 || John Boozer (5–2) || Don Cardwell (3–9) || Turk Farrell (5) || 13,932 || 59–55
|- style="background:#fbb"
| 115 || August 16 || Mets || 3–5 || Cal Koonce (4–2) || Dick Ellsworth (4–5) || Dick Selma (1) || 7,541 || 59–56
|- style="background:#bfb"
| 116 || August 17 || Cubs || 5–2 (12) || Dick Hall (9–7) || Bill Hands (5–6) || None || 15,786 || 60–56
|- style="background:#fbb"
| 117 || August 18 || Cubs || 1–3 || Jim Ellis (1–1) || Larry Jackson (8–12) || Chuck Hartenstein (9) || 16,485 || 60–57
|- style="background:#fbb"
| 118 || August 19 || Cubs || 1–6 || Rich Nye (10–9) || Jim Bunning (13–10) || None || 7,228 || 60–58
|- style="background:#fbb"
| 119 || August 20 || Cubs || 1–6 || Ken Holtzman (7–0) || Chris Short (5–7) || Bill Stoneman (3) || 7,854 || 60–59
|- style="background:#bfb"
| 120 || August 22 (1) || @ Mets || 2–0 || Rick Wise (7–9) || Tom Seaver (12–10) || None || see 2nd game || 61–59
|- style="background:#bfb"
| 121 || August 22 (2) || @ Mets || 11–4 || Larry Jackson (9–12) || Jack Fisher (8–15) || Turk Farrell (6) || 30,951 || 62–59
|- style="background:#bfb"
| 122 || August 23 || @ Mets || 3–2 || Dick Ellsworth (5–5) || Cal Koonce (4–3) || Dick Hall (9) || 18,456 || 63–59
|- style="background:#bbb"
| – || August 24 || Pirates || colspan=6 | Postponed (rain); Makeup: August 25 as a traditional double-header
|- style="background:#bfb"
| 123 || August 25 (1) || Pirates || 2–0 || Jim Bunning (14–10) || Tommie Sisk (10–11) || None || see 2nd game || 64–59
|- style="background:#bfb"
| 124 || August 25 (2) || Pirates || 6–2 || Chris Short (6–7) || Steve Blass (4–6) || Turk Farrell (7) || 13,696 || 65–59
|- style="background:#bfb"
| 125 || August 26 || Pirates || 1–0 || Rick Wise (8–9) || Bob Veale (14–7) || None || 16,454 || 66–59
|- style="background:#bfb"
| 126 || August 27 || Pirates || 2–0 (5) || Larry Jackson (10–12) || Woodie Fryman (2–7) || None || 10,953 || 67–59
|- style="background:#bfb"
| 127 || August 28 || @ Reds || 3–2 || Dick Ellsworth (6–5) || Gerry Arrigo (6–6) || Turk Farrell (8) || 9,524 || 68–59
|- style="background:#fbb"
| 128 || August 29 || @ Reds || 0–1 || Gary Nolan (11–6) || Jim Bunning (14–11) || Ted Abernathy (22) || 8,667 || 68–60
|- style="background:#fbb"
| 129 || August 30 || @ Reds || 1–2 || Milt Pappas (14–9) || Chris Short (6–8) || Ted Abernathy (23) || 6,453 || 68–61
|- style="background:#fbb"
| 130 || August 31 || @ Pirates || 4–6 || Bob Veale (15–7) || Dick Hall (9–8) || Juan Pizarro (5) || 3,406 || 68–62
|-

|- style="background:#fbb"
| 131 || September 1 || @ Pirates || 0–3 || Woodie Fryman (3–7) || Larry Jackson (10–13) || None || 6,113 || 68–63
|- style="background:#fbb"
| 132 || September 2 || @ Pirates || 1–9 || Al McBean (5–3) || Jim Bunning (14–12) || None || 6,431 || 68–64
|- style="background:#bfb"
| 133 || September 3 || @ Pirates || 7–2 || Chris Short (7–8) || Tommie Sisk (10–12) || Turk Farrell (9) || 7,164 || 69–64
|- style="background:#fbb"
| 134 || September 4 (1) || @ Braves || 2–8 || Clay Carroll (6–10) || Rick Wise (8–10) || None || 10,060 || 69–65
|- style="background:#fbb"
| 135 || September 4 (2) || @ Braves || 1–8 || Tony Cloninger (4–6) || Dick Ellsworth (6–6) || Cecil Upshaw (7) || 10,103 || 69–66
|- style="background:#bfb"
| 136 || September 5 || @ Braves || 4–3 (11) || Dick Hall (10–8) || Ed Rakow (3–2) || None || 4,153 || 70–66
|- style="background:#bfb"
| 137 || September 6 || Reds || 9–0 || Jim Bunning (15–12) || Jim Maloney (13–10) || None || 7,822 || 71–66
|- style="background:#fbb"
| 138 || September 7 || Reds || 1–3 || Milt Pappas (15–10) || Chris Short (7–9) || Ted Abernathy (25) || 7,276 || 71–67
|- style="background:#bfb"
| 139 || September 8 || Braves || 4–1 || Rick Wise (9–10) || Clay Carroll (6–11) || None || 11,220 || 72–67
|- style="background:#bfb"
| 140 || September 9 || Braves || 4–3 || Larry Jackson (11–13) || Tony Cloninger (4–7) || Turk Farrell (10) || 9,607 || 73–67
|- style="background:#bfb"
| 141 || September 10 || Braves || 10–5 || Jim Bunning (16–12) || Ken Johnson (13–8) || Turk Farrell (11) || 5,642 || 74–67
|- style="background:#fbb"
| 142 || September 11 || @ Cardinals || 1–5 || Nelson Briles (12–5) || Chris Short (7–10) || None || 18,390 || 74–68
|- style="background:#fbb"
| 143 || September 12 || @ Cardinals || 0–6 || Bob Gibson (12–6) || Rick Wise (9–11) || Larry Jaster (3) || 19,932 || 74–69
|- style="background:#bfb"
| 144 || September 13 || @ Cardinals || 3–0 || Larry Jackson (12–13) || Dick Hughes (14–6) || None || 18,683 || 75–69
|- style="background:#fbb"
| 145 || September 15 (1) || Dodgers || 0–1 || Bill Singer (12–6) || Jim Bunning (16–13) || None || see 2nd game || 75–70
|- style="background:#fbb"
| 146 || September 15 (2) || Dodgers || 0–1 || Don Drysdale (11–15) || Chris Short (7–11) || None || 12,018 || 75–71
|- style="background:#bfb"
| 147 || September 16 || Dodgers || 8–4 (11) || Turk Farrell (10–4) || Ron Perranoski (6–7) || None || 5,549 || 76–71
|- style="background:#bfb"
| 148 || September 17 || Dodgers || 6–1 || Larry Jackson (13–13) || Claude Osteen (16–16) || None || 8,464 || 77–71
|- style="background:#fbb"
| 149 || September 18 || Cardinals || 1–5 || Bob Gibson (13–6) || Dick Ellsworth (6–7) || None || 10,433 || 77–72
|- style="background:#fbb"
| 150 || September 19 || Cardinals || 0–1 || Dick Hughes (15–6) || Jim Bunning (16–14) || None || 9,934 || 77–73
|- style="background:#bfb"
| 151 || September 20 || Cardinals || 3–1 || Chris Short (8–11) || Steve Carlton (14–9) || None || 8,466 || 78–73
|- style="background:#fbb"
| 152 || September 22 || @ Dodgers || 1–7 || Don Sutton (11–15) || Larry Jackson (13–14) || None || 14,006 || 78–74
|- style="background:#bfb"
| 153 || September 23 || @ Dodgers || 4–0 || Jim Bunning (17–14) || Claude Osteen (16–17) || None || 14,943 || 79–74
|- style="background:#bfb"
| 154 || September 24 || @ Dodgers || 3–1 || Rick Wise (10–11) || John Duffie (0–2) || None || 15,259 || 80–74
|- style="background:#fbb"
| 155 || September 25 || @ Astros || 3–4 || Howie Reed (1–1) || Turk Farrell (10–5) || None || 6,771 || 80–75
|- style="background:#fbb"
| 156 || September 26 || @ Astros || 2–3 || Dave Eilers (6–4) || John Boozer (5–3) || None || 7,256 || 80–76
|- style="background:#fbb"
| 157 || September 27 || @ Astros || 0–1 (11) || Mike Cuellar (16–11) || Jim Bunning (17–15) || None || 3,616 || 80–77
|- style="background:#bfb"
| 158 || September 28 || @ Giants || 2–1 || Rick Wise (11–11) || Gaylord Perry (15–17) || Turk Farrell (12) || 3,471 || 81–77
|- style="background:#bfb"
| 159 || September 29 || @ Giants || 9–1 || Chris Short (9–11) || Ron Herbel (4–5) || None || 6,997 || 82–77
|- style="background:#fbb"
| 160 || September 30 (1) || @ Giants || 2–3 || Ray Sadecki (12–6) || Larry Jackson (13–15) || None || see 2nd game || 82–78
|- style="background:#fbb"
| 161 || September 30 (2) || @ Giants || 0–1 || Néstor Chávez (1–0) || John Boozer (5–4) || Lindy McDaniel (2) || 11,667 || 82–79
|-

|- style="background:#fbb"
| 162 || October 1 || @ Giants || 1–2 || Mike McCormick (22–10) || Turk Farrell' (10–6) || None || 33,615 || 82–80
|-

| style="text-align:left;" |
The May 18, 1967, game was protested by the Reds in the bottom of the sixth inning. The protest was later denied.

 Roster 

 Player stats 

 Batting 

 Starters by position Note: Pos = Position; G = Games played; AB = At bats; H = Hits; Avg. = Batting average; HR = Home runs; RBI = Runs batted in Other batters Note: G = Games played; AB = At bats; H = Hits; Avg. = Batting average; HR = Home runs; RBI = Runs batted in Pitching 

 Starting pitchers Note: G = Games pitched; IP = Innings pitched; W = Wins; L = Losses; ERA = Earned run average; SO = Strikeouts Other pitchers Note: G = Games pitched; IP = Innings pitched; W = Wins; L = Losses; ERA = Earned run average; SO = Strikeouts Relief pitchers Note: G = Games pitched; W = Wins; L = Losses; SV = Saves; ERA = Earned run average; SO = Strikeouts Farm system 

LEAGUE CHAMPIONS: San Diego, Spartanburg

 Notes 

 References 
1967 Philadelphia Phillies season at Baseball Reference''

Philadelphia Phillies seasons
Philadelphia Phillies season
Philadelph